Northern Tasmanian is an aboriginal language family of Tasmania in the reconstruction of Claire Bowern.

Languages
Bayesian phylogenetic analysis suggests (at either p < 0.15 or p < 0.20) that two Northern Tasmanian languages (the Northern Tasmanian language and the Port Sorell language) are recorded in the 26 unmixed Tasmanian word lists (out of 35 lists known). Bayesian analysis does not support a connection to other Tasmanian languages. However, manual comparison suggests they are related to the Western Tasmanian languages, which are especially poorly attested, though the similarities may be due to loans.

References

 
Indigenous Australian languages in Tasmania
Language families